FFD may refer to:

Arts and entertainment
 Fall for Dance Festival, in New York City
 Fat Freddy's Drop, a New Zealand band

Businesses
 FF Developments, a British transmission engineering company
 Final Frontier Design, an American spacesuit developer

Government and politics
 Forum for Democracy and Development, a Zambian political party
 Fresno Fire Department, in California, United States
 Finnish Agri-agency for Food and Forest Development Finland

Places
 Fairfield railway station, Melbourne, Australia
 Freshford railway station, Somerset, England
 RAF Fairford, a military airfield in England

Science and technology
 Finite factorization domain, a particular kind of atomic domain
 Flame failure device
 Flange focal distance
 Focus film distance
 Forward flank downdraft, or front flank downdraft
 Free-form deformation
 Front focal distance
 First fit decreasing, an approximation algorithm for the bin packing problem